Brahmeshwar Singh (13 March 1947– 1 June 2012) also known as Mukhiyaji or Brahmeshwar Singh, was head of the upper-caste militia Ranvir Sena in Bihar, India. On 1 June 2012, he was killed by unidentified gunmen.
Brahmeshwar singh mukhiya was a big killer,
They have killed many people like man, chilled, woman's, girls in Laxmuman pur bathe.

Ranvir Sena, arrest, and acquittal
Brahmeshwar Singh Mukhiya was from Bhumihar family and  became the leader of the Ranvir Sena soon after it was formed in 1994. Singh was suspected of involvement in the killings of hundreds of naxalites who recruited people from poor and Dalit background. In 2002, Singh was arrested on "carnage" charges, for which he faced the possibility of life imprisonment. He spent nine years in jail awaiting trial and was released on bail and then later acquitted for insufficient evidence.

Politics
On 5 May 2012, Singh founded the Akhil Bharatiya Rashtravadi Kisan Sangathan, an organization that Singh said would assist farmers and other manual labourers.

Death
On 1 June 2012, Singh was on a morning walk near his home in Arrah, Bihar. Reportedly, around six armed men shot Singh several times. The killing resulted in public unrest and severe rioting. Several thousand people burnt the circuit house, Block Development Officer's office, and several government vehicles; damaged railway offices; and stopped the trains on the Howrah-Delhi route.

See also
Jagdish Mahto
Ashok Mahto gang

References

External links
 , Al Jazeera English
 , CNN-IBN

2012 deaths
Deaths by firearm in India
People from Bihar
People from Bhojpur district, India
1947 births
Place of birth missing
People murdered in Bihar
Far-right politicians in India